Masengo is a Congolese given name and surname. Notable people with the name include:

Edouard Masengo (1933–2003), Congolese guitar player
Masengo Ilunga, Congolese football midfielder

See also
Massengo

Bantu-language surnames